The 24th Polish Film Awards took place on 6 June 2022 at the Polish Theatre in Warsaw, Poland. The ceremony honored the best in Polish cinema of 2021, presented by the Polish Film Academy. It was hosted by actor Maciej Stuhr.

Winners and nominees
The nominations were announced on 16 April 2022. Winners are listed first, highlighted in boldface, and indicated with a double dagger.

Films with multiple awards and nominations

References

External links
 

Polish Film Awards ceremonies
Polish Film Awards
Polish Film Awards